Souchon is a surname, and may refer to:
 Alain Souchon (born 1944), French singer, songwriter and actor
 François Souchon (1787–1857), a French painter.
 Hermann Souchon (1894–1982), German Navy officer, Rosa Luxemburg's murderer
 René Souchon (born 1943), French politician
 Wilhelm Souchon (1864–1946), German World War I admiral

French-language surnames